Maurice Delarue (26 July 1919; Antrain, Ille-et-Vilaine, France – 10 March 2013) was a French journalist.

He was a member and former president of the International Francophone Press Union and a member of the Association of the Diplomatic Press (former president from 1962 till 1963).

Biography 
Compelled to stop his studies of English in Rennes to enter in the Résistance, Maurice Delarue began his career as journalist in France Soir. He was also a journalist for Le Monde, where he covered foreign affairs matters up to his retirement.

Bibliography 
 Contre la mémoire courte (L'Âge d'Homme 1999)

References 

French journalists
French Resistance members
1919 births
2013 deaths
French male non-fiction writers